The 2021 UEFA European Under-21 Championship qualifying competition was a men's under-21 footballtournament that determined the 14 teams that would be joining the automatically qualified co-hosts Hungary and Slovenia in the 2021 UEFA European Under-21 Championship tournament final.

Apart from Hungary and Slovenia, all the remaining 53 UEFA member national teams entered the qualifying tournament. Players born on or after 1 January 1998 are eligible to participate.

Format
The qualifying competition would originally consist of the following two rounds:
Qualifying group stage: The 53 teams are drawn into nine groups: eight groups of six teams and one group of five teams. Each group is played in home-and-away round-robin format. The nine group winners and the best runners-up (not counting results against the sixth-placed team) qualify directly for the tournament final, while the remaining eight runners-up advance to the play-offs.
Play-offs: The eight teams are drawn into four ties to play home-and-away two-legged matches to determine the last four qualified teams.

However, due to the COVID-19 pandemic in Europe which caused the postponement of matches in the qualifying group stage, UEFA announced on 17 June 2020 that the play-offs would be cancelled. Instead, the nine group winners and the five best runners-up (not counting results against the sixth-placed team) qualify for the tournament final.

Tiebreakers
In the qualifying group stage, teams are ranked according to points (3 points for a win, 1 point for a draw, 0 points for a loss), and if tied on points, the following tiebreaking criteria are applied, in the order given, to determine the rankings (Regulations Article 14.01):
Points in head-to-head matches among tied teams;
Goal difference in head-to-head matches among tied teams;
Goals scored in head-to-head matches among tied teams;
Away goals scored in head-to-head matches among tied teams;
If more than two teams are tied, and after applying all head-to-head criteria above, a subset of teams are still tied, all head-to-head criteria above are reapplied exclusively to this subset of teams;
Goal difference in all group matches;
Goals scored in all group matches;
Away goals scored in all group matches;
Wins in all group matches;
Away wins in all group matches;
Disciplinary points (red card = 3 points, yellow card = 1 point, expulsion for two yellow cards in one match = 3 points);
UEFA coefficient ranking for the qualifying group stage draw.

To determine the five best runners-up from the qualifying group stage, the results against the teams in sixth place are discarded. The following criteria are applied (Regulations Article 15.02):
Points;
Goal difference;
Goals scored;
Away goals scored;
Wins;
Away wins;
Disciplinary points;
UEFA coefficient ranking for the qualifying group stage draw.

Effects of the COVID-19 pandemic
Due to the COVID-19 pandemic in Europe, the UEFA Executive Committee approved on 28 August 2020 the following principles for the qualifying phase of the 2021 UEFA European Under-21 Championship:
If a team cannot field the minimum required number of players (at least 13 players including at least one goalkeeper) due to positive SARS-CoV-2 tests and the match cannot be rescheduled, the team responsible for the match not taking place are considered to have forfeited the match and lost 0–3.
If UEFA comes to the conclusion that both or none of the teams are responsible for the match not taking place, the outcome of the match will be decided by drawing of lots, either home win 1–0, home loss 0–1 or draw 0–0, carried out by the UEFA administration.

Schedule
The qualifying matches are played on dates that fall within the FIFA International Match Calendar. The qualifying group stage was originally to end in October 2020, but was extended to November 2020 due to the postponement of the matches in March 2020. The play-offs, originally scheduled to be played between 9–17 November 2020, were cancelled.

Qualifying group stage

Draw
The draw for the qualifying group stage was held on 11 December 2018, 09:00 CET (UTC+1), at the UEFA headquarters in Nyon, Switzerland.

The teams were seeded according to their coefficient ranking, calculated based on the following:
2015 UEFA European Under-21 Championship tournament final and qualifying competition (20%)
2017 UEFA European Under-21 Championship tournament final and qualifying competition (40%)
2019 UEFA European Under-21 Championship qualifying competition (40%)

Each group contained one team from each of Pots A–F (Pots A–E for five-team group). Based on the decisions taken by the UEFA Emergency Panel, Spain and Gibraltar, and Serbia and Kosovo would not be drawn in the same group.

Notes
Teams marked in bold qualified for the tournament final.

Groups

Group 1

Group 2

Group 3

Group 4

Group 5

Group 6

Group 7

Group 8

Group 9

Ranking of second-placed teams
To determine the five best second-placed teams from the qualifying group stage which qualify to the tournament final, only the results of the second-placed teams against the first, third, fourth and fifth-placed teams in their group are taken into account, while results against the sixth-placed team in six-team groups are not included. As a result, eight matches played by each second-placed team are counted for the purposes of determining the ranking.

Play-offs
The draw for the play-offs, to decide the matchups and the order of legs, was intended to be held on 16 October 2020 at the UEFA headquarters in Nyon, Switzerland. The matches were intended to be played between 9–17 November 2020, with the four play-off winners qualifying for the tournament final. However, the play-offs were cancelled due to the COVID-19 pandemic.

Qualified teams
The following 16 teams qualify for the tournament final.

1 Bold indicates champions for that year. Italic indicates hosts for that year.
2 As Czechoslovakia
3 As Soviet Union
4 As West Germany

Top goalscorers

References

External links

Under-21 Matches: 2021 Qualifying, UEFA.com

 
Qualification
2021
2019 in youth association football
2020 in youth association football
U21 Championship qualification
U21 Championship qualification
U21 Championship qualification
March 2019 sports events in Europe
June 2019 sports events in Europe
September 2019 sports events in Europe
October 2019 sports events in Europe
November 2019 sports events in Europe
September 2020 sports events in Europe
October 2020 sports events in Europe
November 2020 sports events in Europe
Association football events postponed due to the COVID-19 pandemic